Judy Green is an American volleyball coach. She is the former head coach of the volleyball team at the University of Alabama (1996–2010), and was formerly the head coach at the University of Montevallo from 1986-1995.  She is a graduate of Tuscola High School in Waynesville, NC and of Western Carolina University in Cullowhee, NC where she lettered in 12 varsity sports, the only WCU athlete to ever do so.

References 

Year of birth missing (living people)
Living people
People from Waynesville, North Carolina
Tuscola High School alumni
Western Carolina University alumni